Di Bello is an Italian family name of disputed origin, originating from the Latin word "di" meaning "of" and "bello", referring to a first name that can be of English, German, or Spanish origin as well as Italian. The name may refer to:

See also
Bello (surname)
Di Bella

Italian-language surnames